Bridge in Lykens Township No. 1 is a historic multi-span stone arch bridge spanning Pine Creek at Lykens Township, Dauphin County, Pennsylvania. It has two large arches and one small arch. The property measures 127 feet long by 25 feet wide.  It features a stone parapet with a concrete cap and concrete parapet.

It was added to the National Register of Historic Places in 1988.

References

Road bridges on the National Register of Historic Places in Pennsylvania
Bridges in Dauphin County, Pennsylvania
National Register of Historic Places in Dauphin County, Pennsylvania
Stone arch bridges in the United States